Tenthredinidae is the largest family of sawflies, with well over 7,500 species worldwide, divided into 430 genera. Larvae are herbivores and typically feed on the foliage of trees and shrubs, with occasional exceptions that are leaf miners, stem borers, or gall makers. The larvae of externally feeding species resemble small caterpillars. As with all hymenopterans, common sawflies undergo complete metamorphosis.

The family has no easily seen diagnostic features, though the combination of five to nine antennal flagellomeres plus a clear separation of the first abdominal tergum from the metapleuron can reliably separate them. These sawflies are often black or brown, and 3 to 20 mm long.  Like other sawflies, they lack the slender "wasp-waist", or petiole, between the thorax and abdomen, characteristic of many hymenopterans. The mesosoma and the metasoma are instead broadly joined. The Tenthredinidae are also often somewhat dorsoventrally flattened, which will distinguish them at least from the slender cephids (which, together with the common sawflies, comprise many of the Nearctic species of Symphyta).

Females use their saw-like ovipositors to cut slits through barks of twigs, into which translucent eggs are wedged, which damages the trees. They are common in meadows, and in forest glades near rapid streams. Adults eat little, while larvae feed on foliage of streamside trees and shrubs, especially willow.

A number of species and genera have been described from the fossil record such as Eriocampa tulameenensis and Pseudosiobla campbelli of British Columbia.

Life cycle of Cladius difformis

Taxonomy 
The Tenthredinidae are divided into seven subfamilies. Of the 430 genera, nine contain more than 50 species.

Subfamilies and genera 
Subfamilies and genera within this family include:

 Subfamily Allantinae
 Adamas Malaise, 1945
 Allantus Panzer, 1801
 Ametastegia A. Costa, 1882
 Apethymus Benson, 1939
 Athalia Leach, 1817

 Empria Lepeletier, 1828
 Eriocampa Hartig, 1837
 Monosoma MacGillivray, 1908
 Monostegia O. Costa, 1859
 Taxonus Hartig, 1837
 Subfamily Blennocampinae
 Ardis Konow, 1886
 Blennocampa Hartig, 1837
 Cladardis Benson, 1952
 Claremontia Rohwer, 1909
 Eutomostethus Enslin, 1914
 Halidamia Benson, 1939
 Hoplocampoides Enslin, 1913
 Monardis Benson, 1952
 Monophadnoides Ashmead, 1898
 Monophadnus Hartig, 1837
 Paracharactus MacGillivray, 1908
 Periclista Konow, 1886
 Phymatocera Dahlbom, 1835
 Rhadinoceraea Konow, 1886
 Stethomostus Benson, 1939
 Tomostethus Konow, 1886
 Subfamily Heterarthrinae
 Caliroa O. Costa, 1859
 Endelomyia Ashmead, 1898
 Fenella Westwood, 1840
 Fenusa Leach, 11817
 Heterarthrus Stephens, 1835
 Messa Leach, 1817
 Metallus Forbes, 1885
 Parna Benson, 1936
 Profenusa MacGillivray, 1914
 Rocalia Takeuchi, 1952
 Scolioneura Konow, 1890
 Subfamily Nematinae
 Amauronematus Konow, 1890
 Anoplonyx Marlatt, 1896
 Cladius Illiger, 1807
 Croesus Leach, 1817
 Decanematus Malaise, 1931
 Dineura Dahlbom, 1835
 Eitelius Kontuniemi, 1966
 Endophytus Hering, 1934
 Eupontania Zinovjev, 1985
 Euura Newman, 1837
 Hemichroa Stephens, 1835
 Hoplocampa Hartig, 1837
 Mesoneura Hartig, 1837
 Micronematus Konow, 1890
 Nematinus Rohwer, 1911
 Nematus Panzer, 1801
 Pachynematus Konow, 1890
 Pikonema Ross, 1937
 Platycampus Schiødte, 1839
 Pontania Costa, 1859
 Pontopristia Malaise, 1921
 Priophorus Dahlbom, 1835
 Pristiphora Latreille, 1810
 Pseudodineura Konow, 1885
 Sharliphora Wong, 1969
 Stauronematus Benson, 1953
 Trichiocampus Hartig, 1837
 Subfamily Selandriinae
 Aneugmenus Hartig, 1837
 Birka Malaise, 1944
 Brachythops Haliday, 1839
 Dolerus Jurine, 1807
 Hemitaxonus Ashmead, 1898
 Heptamelus Haliday, 1855
 Loderus Konow, 1890
 Nesoselandria Rohwer, 1910
 Pseudoheptamelus Conde, 1932
 Selandria Leach, 1817
 Strombocerina Malaise, 1942
 Strongylogaster Dahlbom, 1835
 Subfamily Susaninae
 Susana Rohwer & Middleton, 1932
 Subfamily Tenthredininae
 Aglaostigma Kirby, 1882
 Eurogaster Zirngiebl, 1953
 Ischyroceraea Kiaer, 1898
 Macrophya Dahlbom, 1835
 Pachyprotasis Hartig, 1837
 Perineura Hartig, 1837
 Rhogogaster Konow, 1884
 Siobla Cameron, 1877
 Tenthredo Linnaeus, 1758
 Tenthredopsis A. Costa, 1859
 Tyloceridius Malaise, 1945
 Ussurinus Malaise, 1931

Phylogeny 
Of these subfamilies, Tenthredininae and Allantinae are sister groups, and together form a sister group to the Nematinae.

References

Bibliography

 , in 
 , in 
 
 
 , in Taeger, A. & Blank, S. M. (eds.), Pflanzenwespen Deutschlands (Hymenoptera, Symphyta) Kommentierte Bestandsaufname. Deutsches Entomologisches Institut, Goecke& Evers, Keltern.

External links
Hymis de Image gallery

 
Sawfly families
Insect pests of temperate forests
Taxa named by Pierre André Latreille